The Fossmobile was Canada’s first successful internal combustion, gasoline engine automobile. Manufactured by George Foote Foss in 1897, only one Fossmobile is known to have existed.

History

The Fossmobile was designed and manufactured by George Foote Foss. He owned his own shop in Sherbrooke, Quebec, offering machining, blacksmithing, and bicycle repair. He became interested in automobiles after riding in an electric brougham while visiting Boston, Massachusetts. During the winter of 1896, Foss worked on a four-horsepower, single-cylinder automobile that he completed in the spring of 1897. The vehicle was the first of its kind to be built in Canada.  

Foss drove his car in and around Sherbrooke, Quebec for four years. He later moved to Montreal, Quebec, where the car sat idle for a year before he sold it for $75 in 1902. Foss had previously turned down an offer to partner with Henry Ford from the Ford Motor Company. He turned down the offer as he believed Ford's vehicle to be inferior to the Fossmobile. He also turned down financial backing to mass produce the Fossmobile, citing his inexperience to do so.

Vehicle specifications

The "Fossmobile," as it was later dubbed, was different from other automobiles that were being built, as it had a front mounted engine. Other automobile designers had placed their engines centered and beneath the seat. The Fossmobile's front mounted engine made maintenance easier and produced considerably less upward vibration through the seat. The gear shifter for the Fossmobile was mounted directly on the tiller style steering column, something that was not done by other manufacturers for another 40 years. The vehicle could travel up to 15 MPH (24 km per hour) and climb any of Sherbrooke's steep hills.

Replica
A replica Fossmobile was built for the 125th anniversary, by a team in Burlington, Ontario, and at the Legendary Motor Car Company in Halton Hills, Ontario, spearheaded by Foss's grandson Ronald Foss, to be shown in Sherbrooke, Quebec, before moving to the Canadian Automotive Museum in Oshawa, Ontario.

Further reading

 Recollections of Sherbrooke, The True Story of a Small Town Boy (George Foote Foss), Sherbrooke Daily Record (April 1954)
 Automobiles of the World: The Story of the Development of the Automobile (Joseph H. Wherry), Chilton Book Company (1968)

References

External links

 Fossmobile website
 George Foote Foss and the Fossmobile - Township Heritage WebMagazine

Cars of Canada
Defunct motor vehicle manufacturers of Canada
Cars introduced in 1897